Lyon County is the name of five counties in the United States:

 Lyon County, Iowa 
 Lyon County, Kansas 
 Lyon County, Kentucky 
 Lyon County, Minnesota 
 Lyon County, Nevada